Butterfly Train was an indie rock band formed in 1994 in the state of Idaho. It was led by bassist and vocalist Brett Nelson. They created two full-length albums which were released on Up Records.

Discography

Albums
 Building Distrust From Trust ; UP #005 (1994)
 Distorted, Retarded, Peculiar ; UP #021 (1996)

Singles
 Blame Weight b/w Dog Day ; UP #004 (1994)

Compilation Appearances
 Blame Weight from the Up Records compilation Stacked Up!; UP #014 (1995)

Notes

Indie rock musical groups from Idaho